In the United Kingdom, an ancient woodland is a woodland that has existed continuously since 1600 or before in England, Wales and Northern Ireland (or 1750 in Scotland). Planting of woodland was uncommon before those dates, so a wood present in 1600 is likely to have developed naturally.

In most ancient woods, the trees and shrubs have been cut down periodically as part of the management cycle. Provided that the area has remained as woodland, the stand is still considered ancient. Since it may have been cut over many times in the past, ancient woodland does not necessarily contain very old trees.

For many species of animal and plant, ancient woodland sites provide the sole habitat, and for many others, conditions on these sites are much more suitable than those on other sites. Ancient woodland in the UK, like rainforest in the tropics, is home to rare and threatened species. For these reasons ancient woodland is often described as an irreplaceable resource, or 'critical natural capital'. The analogous term used in the United States, Canada and Australia (for woodlands that do contain very old trees) is "old-growth forest".

Ancient woodland is formally defined on maps by Natural England and equivalent bodies. Mapping of ancient woodland has been undertaken in different ways and at different times, and the quality and availability of data varies from region to region, although there are some efforts to standardise and update it.

Protection
Many ancient woodlands have legal protection of various types, but it is not automatically the case that any ancient woodland is protected. Some examples of ancient woodland are nationally or locally designated, for example as Sites of Special Scientific Interest. Others have no designations.

Ancient woodlands also require special consideration when they are affected by planning application. The National Planning Policy Framework published in 2012 is the government policy document relating to planning decisions affecting ancient woodland. The importance of ancient woodlands as an irreplaceable habitat is set out in paragraph 118 of the NPPF, which states: ‘planning permission should be refused for development resulting in the loss or deterioration of irreplaceable habitats, including ancient woodland and the loss of aged or veteran trees found outside ancient woodland, unless the need for, and benefits of, the development in that location clearly outweigh the loss.’

Characteristics

The concept of ancient woodland, rich in plant diversity and managed through traditional practices, was developed by the ecologist Oliver Rackham in his 1980 book Ancient Woodland, its History, Vegetation and Uses in England, which he wrote following his earlier research on Hayley Wood in Cambridgeshire.

The definition of ancient woodland includes two sub-types: Ancient semi-natural woodland (ASNW) and Planted ancient woodland site (PAWS).

Ancient semi-natural woodland (ASNW) is composed of native tree species that have not obviously been planted; features of ancient woodland often survive in many of these woods as well, including characteristic wildlife and structures of archaeological interest.

Planted ancient woodland (PAWS) is an ancient woodland site where the native species have been partially or wholly replaced with a non locally native species (usually but not always conifers). These woodlands typically have a plantation structure, with even aged crops of one or two species planted for commercial purposes. Many of these ancient woodlands were converted to conifer plantations following war-time fellings. PAWS sites, whilst not being of such high ecological value as ASNW, typically contain remnants of semi-natural species where shading has been less intense, and restoration of more semi-natural structures through gradual thinning is often possible. Since the recognition of the ecological and historical values of ancient woodland, PAWS restoration has been a priority amongst many woodland owners and governmental and non-governmental agencies, and has been supported by various grant schemes. Some restored PAWS sites are now practically indistinguishable from ASNW. There is no formal method for reclassifying restored PAWS as ASNW, although some woodland managers now use the acronym RPAWS (Restored planted ancient woodland) for a restored site.

Species which are particularly characteristic of ancient woodland sites are called ancient woodland indicator species, such as bluebells, ramsons, wood anemone, yellow archangel and primrose for example, representing a type of ecological indicator.  The term tends to be applied more usefully to desiccation-sensitive plant species, and particularly lichens and bryophytes, than to animals, as they are slower to colonise planted woodlands, and are thus viewed as more reliable indicators of ancient woodland sites. Sequences of pollen analysis are also indicators of forest continuity.

Lists of ancient woodland indicator species among vascular plants were developed by the Nature Conservancy Council (now Natural England) for each region of England, each list containing the hundred most reliable indicators for that region. The methodology involved studying the plants of known woodland sites and analysing patterns of occurrence to determine which species were most indicative of sites from before 1600. In England this resulted in the first national Ancient Woodland Inventory, produced in the 1980s.

Although ancient woodland indicator species can and do occur in post-1600 woodlands, and also in non-woodland sites such as hedgerows, it is uncommon for a site which is not ancient woodland to host a double-figure indicator species total. More recent methodologies also supplement these field observations and ecological measurements with historical data from maps and local records, which were not fully assessed in the original Nature Conservancy Council surveys.

History
Ancient woods were valuable properties for their owners, as a source of wood fuel, timber (estovers and loppage) and forage for pigs (pannage). In southern England, hazel was particularly important for coppicing, the branches being used for wattle and daub in buildings, for example. Such old coppice stumps are easily recognised for their current overgrown state, now that the practice has largely disappeared. Large boles emerge from a common stump in such overgrown coppice stools. Originally, the term of 'forest' did not refer solely to woodland; it also included parkland, open heathland, upland fells, and any other territory, between or outside of manorial freehold, and was the exclusive hunting preserve of the monarch, or granted to nobility. The ancient woods that were within forests, were frequently Royal Parks, enjoying special protection against poachers and other interlopers, and subject to tolls and fines where trackways passed through them or when firewood was permitted to be collected or other licence granted. The forest law was very strictly enforced, by a hierarchy of foresters, parkers and woodwards. In English land law, it was illegal to assart any part of a royal forest. This was the greatest trespass that could be committed in a forest, being more than a waste: for whereas waste of the forest involves felling trees, they can grow again; assarting involves completely rooting up trees within the woodland of the afforested area.

Boundary marking
Ancient woods were well-defined, often being surrounded by a bank and ditch, so that they could be easily recognised. The bank may also support a living fence of hawthorn or blackthorn to prevent livestock or deer entering. They are attracted by young shoots on coppice stools, so must be excluded if the coppice is to regenerate. Such indicators can still be seen in many ancient woodlands, and large forest are often sub-divided into woods and coppices with banks and ditches as before. The hedges at the edges are often overgrown and may have spread laterally owing to the neglect of many years.

Many ancient woods are listed in the Domesday Book of 1086, as well as the earlier Anglo-Saxon Chronicle, such was their value to early communities as a source of fuel, but also of food for farm animals. The boundaries are frequently described in terms of features such as large trees, streams or tracks, and even standing stones for example.

Ancient woodland inventories
There was no inventory in Northern Ireland until the Woodland Trust completed one in 2006.

Destruction
Britain's ancient woodland cover has declined greatly. Since the 1930s almost half of ancient broadleaved woodland in England and Wales has been planted with conifers or cleared for agriculture. Only  of ancient semi-natural woodland survive in Britain – less than 20% of the total wooded area.

Management

Most ancient woodland in the UK has been managed in some way by humans for hundreds (in some cases probably thousands) of years. Two traditional techniques are coppicing (harvesting wood by cutting trees back to ground level) and pollarding (harvesting wood at about human head height to prevent new shoots being eaten by grazing species such as deer). Both techniques encourage new growth while allowing the sustainable production of timber and other woodland produce. During the 20th century, use of such traditional management techniques has declined while there has been an increase in large-scale mechanised forestry. Thus coppicing is now rarely practised, and overgrown coppice stools are a common sight in many ancient woods, with their many trunks of similar size. These changes in management methods have resulted in changes to ancient woodland habitats, and a loss of ancient woodland to forestry.

Examples

Bedgebury Forest, Kent
Bernwood Forest, Buckinghamshire and Oxfordshire 
Bradfield Woods, Suffolk
Bradley Woods, Wiltshire
Burnham Beeches, Bucks
Cannock Chase, Staffordshire
Cherry Tree Wood, London
Coldfall Wood, London
Dolmelynllyn Estate, Gwynedd
Dyscarr Woods, Nottinghamshire.
Edford Woods and Meadows, Somerset
Epping Forest, Essex
Forest of Dean West Gloucestershire
Foxley Wood, Norfolk
Grass Wood, Wharfedale, Yorkshire
Hatfield Forest, Essex
Hazleborough Wood, Northamptonshire, part of Whittlewood Forest
Highgate Wood, London
Hollington Wood, Buckinghamshire 
Holt Heath, Dorset
King's Wood, Heath and Reach, Bedfordshire
Lower Woods, Gloucestershire
New Forest, Hampshire
Parkhurst Forest, Isle of Wight
Puzzlewood, in the Forest of Dean
Queen's Wood, London
Ryton Woods, Warwickshire
Salcey Forest, Northamptonshire
Savernake Forest, Wiltshire
Sherwood Forest, Nottinghamshire
Snakes Wood, Suffolk
Titnore Wood, West Sussex
Vincients Wood, Wiltshire
Wentwood, Monmouthshire
Whinfell Forest, Cumbria
Windsor Great Park, Berkshire
Whittlewood Forest, Northamptonshire
Wormshill, Kent: Barrows Wood, Trundle Wood and High Wood
Wyre Forest, bordering Shropshire and Worcestershire
Yardley Chase, Northamptonshire
Wistman's Wood, Devon

See also

References

External links
Ancient Tree Guides by the Woodland Trust

History of forestry
Forests and woodlands of the United Kingdom
Forests and woodlands of England
Old-growth forests
Forest history
Types of formally designated forests